National Printing Agency Football Club is a Somali football club based in Mogadishu, Somalia which currently plays in Somali Second Division the second division of Somali Football.

In 1983 the team has won the Somalia League.

Stadium
Currently the team plays at the 15000 capacity Banadir Stadium.

Honours
 Somalia League: 1983

References

External links
 

Football clubs in Somalia
Works association football teams